Carrie-Lynn Neales is a Canadian actress. She is most noted for her role in the television series Seed, for which she received Canadian Screen Award nominations for Best Actress in a Comedy Series at the 2nd Canadian Screen Awards in 2014 and at the 3rd Canadian Screen Awards in 2015. In 2020, she starred in Hudson & Rex episode of "Rex in the City" as Holly Preston.

References

External links

21st-century Canadian actresses
Canadian television actresses
Canadian film actresses
Canadian stage actresses
Actresses from Toronto
Writers from Toronto
Living people
Year of birth missing (living people)